Personal development planning is the process of creating an action plan based on awareness, values, reflection, goal-setting and planning for personal development within the context of a career, education, relationship or for self-improvement. Its functions include developing an awareness of the skills an individual already possesses and identifying and developing the skills they need.

The PDP (personal development plan), also called an IDP (individual development plan) or a PEP (personal enterprise plan), usually includes a statement of one's  aspirations, strengths or competencies, education and training, and stages or steps to indicate how the plan is to be realized. Personal development plans may also include a statement of one's career and  lifestyle priorities, career positioning, analysis of opportunities and risks, and alternative plans (Plan B), and a curriculum vitae (CV).

In higher education, personal development plans typically include a portfolio containing evidence of the skills gathered over a particular timeframe. It is presumed in education that undertaking PDPs will assist in creating self-directed independent learners who are more likely to progress to higher levels of academic attainment. Human-resource management also uses PDPs. 

Personal development plans are often a requirement for employee CVs. Employees who participate in business training are often asked to complete a personal development plan.

An individual can often develop a five-year personal development plan to organize personal goals and to make them achievable within a certain time-period.

References

External links
 QAA Guidelines for Progress Files

Student assessment and evaluation
Human resource management
Curricula
Personal development